Alfred Wingate Craven (20 October 1810 - 29 March 1879) was a chief engineer of the Croton Aqueduct Department, was a founding member—and host of its initial meeting—of the American Society of Civil Engineers and Architects, which later became the American Society of Civil Engineers (ASCE).

Biography
He was born on 20 October 1810 in Washington, D.C. He graduated from Columbia University in 1829, studied law and then civil engineering.

In 1837 he was associated with General George S. Greene on professional work near Charleston and elsewhere. He was a railroad engineer and manager, and rapidly rose to the first rank in his profession.

Craven became engineer commissioner to the Croton Water Board of New York on its organization in 1849, and continued in that capacity until 1868. Among the many works projected and carried out during these years under his supervision were the building of the large reservoir in Central Park, the enlargement of pipes across High Bridge, and the construction of the reservoir in Boyd's Corners, Putnam co. He also caused to be made an accurate survey of Croton River valley, with a view of ascertaining its capacity for furnishing an adequate water supply, and was largely instrumental in securing the passage of the first law establishing a general sewerage system for New York City.

Later he was associated with Allan Campbell as a commissioner in the work of building the underground railway extending along 4th Avenue from the Grand Central Depot to Harlem River.

He was one of the original members of the American Society of Civil Engineers, a director for many years, and its president from November 1869, until November 1871.

He died on 29 March 1879 in Chiswick, England and is buried in Green-Wood Cemetery in Brooklyn, New York.

Family
Two of his brothers were noted naval officers:  Thomas Tingey Craven and Tunis Craven. Thomas Tingey Craven's son Alfred Craven, also an engineer, worked on design for the New York City Subway. Another relative is John Craven, the former Chief Scientist of Polaris and the Special Projects Office.

References

External links
 
 

1810 births
1879 deaths
American civil engineers
Naval Consulting Board
Place of birth missing
Phillips Exeter Academy alumni
Columbia College (New York) alumni